BSE may refer to:

Medicine
 Bovine spongiform encephalopathy, also known as mad cow disease, a neurodegenerative disease of cattle
 Breast self-examination

Stock exchanges
 Bahrain Stock Exchange, Bahrain
 Baku Stock Exchange, Azerbaijan
 Barbados Stock Exchange
 Bombay Stock Exchange, Mumbai, India
 Boston Stock Exchange, Massachusetts, US
 Botswana Stock Exchange in Gaborone, Botswana
 Budapest Stock Exchange, Hungary
 Bulgarian Stock Exchange – Sofia, BSE-Sofia
  Nepal Stock Exchange - Nepal

Other uses
 Blueprint for a Safer Economy, California classification of safe practices within a lockdown economy
 Britain Stronger in Europe, a lobbying group 
 Board of Secondary Education, Odisha, India
 Biological systems engineering
 Bury St Edmunds railway station (station code), Suffolk, England
 Backscattered electron (see scanning electron microscope)
 Blender Stack Exchange, a Q&A site for the Blender 3D software
 BSE (satellite), a Japanese satellite
 Bachelor of Science in Engineering, an undergraduate academic degree awarded to a student after 3-5 years of studying engineering at a university or college
 Black Sun Empire, a Dutch drum and bass group
 Bethe–Salpeter equation, an equation in quantum field theory
 Bendigo South East College, a secondary school in Victoria, Australia
 Banco de Seguros del Estado, a Uruguayan state-owned insurance company

See also
 Creutzfeldt–Jakob disease, sometimes called a human form of bovine spongiform encephalopathy